Karrantza Harana/Valle de Carranza (in Basque Karrantza Harana, in Spanish Valle de Carranza), is a town and municipality located in the province of Biscay, in the Basque Country. It is located in the comarca of Enkarterri and it is the westernmost and largest (by area) municipality of the province.

Film director Víctor Erice was born there.

Etymology 

The first recorded appearance of the toponym of Carranza is on the Chronicle of Alfonso III, dated in the 10th Century, where it appears as Carrantia. According to the text, Carrantia was one of the towns known to be populated during the reign of Alfonso I, King of Asturias. The origin of Carrantia comes from the Cantabrian dialect, meaning "high rocks". From Carrantia it would evolve to Carranza, the current Spanish toponym. Karrantza is the Basque toponym, an adaptation of Carranza following the Basque orthographic rules, and it is the official name of the municipality since 2001.

History 

The first known vestiges of the human presence in the valley of Karrantza are some lithic tools, from the late Middle Paleolithic. In Karrantza is located the sanctuary of Venta Laperra, the oldest of the entire Basque Country, with several forms of Paleolithic art. There is evidence of ancient pastoral activity, as well as art forms belonging to hunter-gatherers from the Neolithic and the Bronze Age.

The oral traditions tells of the presence of Romans in the lands of the valley, which were interested in the exploitation of galena from the Ubal mountains. Diggings effectuated in some of the caves within the municipality revealed Roman pottery. In 1903 more than one hundred Roman coins were found, all dated from 238 to 260.

The first records about the valley of Karrantza are from the 8th Century, when the King of Asturias Alfonso I was conducting a series of resettlements on the Atlantic region of the Iberian Peninsula, as they were mentioned in the Chronicle of Alfonso III one century later.

The valley of Karrantza was incorporated to the Lord of Biscay in the 12th Century. It belongs to the territory of the Enkarterri, which was itself incorporated to Biscay in the 13th Century.

Population

 1900 - 4,237 people
 1910 - 4,463 people
 1920 - 4,506 people
 1930 - 4,458 people
 1940 - 4,479 people
 1950 - 4,687 people
 1960 - 4,490 people
 1970 - 3,953 people
 1981 - 3,392 people
 1991 - 3,149 people
 2001 - 2,887 people
 2004 - 2,884 people

Geography 

Karrantza is located in the westernmost part of the Enkarterri region and is the largest (by area) of all the municipalities of Biscay. Karratza is 54 kilometers away from the head of province Bilbao and limits at north by the autonomous community of Cantabria, at east mostly with the Cantabrian exclave of Villaverde de Trucios, and the Basque municipalities of Turtzioz and Artzentales, at south with the province of Burgos and at west with the tiny municipality of Lanestosa and the Cantabrian community.

Sports

The Karrantza CD football club is the most important sport club. It is in regional categories of Basque football.

References

External links
 CARRANZA in the Bernardo Estornés Lasa - Auñamendi Encyclopedia (Euskomedia Fundazioa) 

Municipalities in Biscay